Richard John Huggett (born January 1944) is a British former teacher who has been a candidate in a number of elections, using descriptions which were similar to those of established political parties, leading to this practice being outlawed under the Registration of Political Parties Act 1998.

Background
Huggett studied psychology and zoology at the University of London and obtained a diploma in social and administrative studies. He lived for about 10 years in the South of France where he built yachts. Huggett was reported to have been an intelligence officer, who from 1989 ran a school for children in Hampshire. The school closed down in 1993 when the lease ran out on the building. He was a father of four, and had produced a first education video.

1994 European Parliament election
At the European Parliament Election, 1994, Huggett was nominated under the label "Literal Democrat" for the Devon and East Plymouth seat. He ran his campaign from Canonteign Manor, the home he shared with his mother near Christow in the Teign valley in Devon. In an interview recorded during the campaign but due to be broadcast after it Huggett hinted that future government should be conducted through electronic referendums and said "the traditional party system generates all sorts of undemocratic processes."

When the nominations closed and it was revealed that Huggett was a candidate with the description "Literal Democrat", the Liberal Democrats launched legal action in the High Court of Justice alleging that the Returning Officer had wrongly accepted a nomination which was designed to confuse voters. The Judge ruled that the nomination had to stand. In the result, Huggett won over 10,000 votes, far more than the 700 vote majority of the Conservative candidate over the Liberal Democrat.

Winchester constituency
Huggett also attempted to run as "Gerald Maclone" in the Winchester constituency in the 1997 General Election and the following by-election (the sitting MP was junior minister Gerry Malone). He stood under his own name as "Liberal Democrat Top Choice for Parliament" in the General Election and as a "Literal Democrat Mark Here to Win" in the following by-election.

References

1944 births
Living people
1994 elections in the United Kingdom
1997 elections in the United Kingdom
European Parliament elections in the United Kingdom
Alumni of the University of London
Place of birth missing (living people)